Brian Roy Clarke (born 10 October 1968) is an English former professional footballer. Born in Eastbourne, he played for Gillingham between 1988 and 1992, making 52 appearances, 44 were in the Football League until he sustained a knee injury. He later played for Sittingbourne

References

1968 births
Living people
English footballers
Eastbourne Town F.C. players
Gillingham F.C. players
Sittingbourne F.C. players
Sportspeople from Eastbourne
Association football defenders